Eduardo Luís Barreto Ferro Rodrigues  (born 3 November 1949) is a Portuguese politician and economist who had been President of the Assembly of the Republic since 2015 until 29 March 2022, in the 13th (2015–2019) and 14th Legislatures (2019–2022). He was Minister for Social Security, and later Minister for Public Works, in the governments of António Guterres.

Early life and education
Born in Lisbon, he obtained the degree of licenciado in economics at what today is the Instituto Superior de Economia e Gestão (ISEG) of Lisbon University, and is a lecturer in economics at ISCTE - University Institute of Lisbon.

Political career
In 2002, Ferro Rodrigues was elected Secretary-General of the Portuguese Socialist Party, a position he retained for two years. He resigned on 9 July 2004, immediately after President Jorge Sampaio announced a decision not to hold early elections when Prime Minister José Manuel Barroso stepped down from office in order to be appointed President of the European Commission. Shortly after, Rodrigues was appointed as Ambassador, Permanent Representative of Portugal to the OECD.

Following the October 2015 parliamentary election, he was elected as President of the Assembly of the Republic on 23 October 2015 with the support of the Socialists, the Communists and the Left Bloc. Ferro received 120 votes against 108 votes for the candidate of the centre-right government.

After the 2019 parliamentary election, Ferro Rodrigues was re-elected as President of the Assembly of the Republic, receiving 178 votes in favor.

Family
Married to Maria Filomena Lopes Peixoto de Aguilar, he has two children, João Luís de Aguilar Ferro Rodrigues and a daughter, television presenter Rita Ferro Rodrigues.

Honours

Portuguese honours 

  Grand-Cross of the Order of Liberty, Portugal (5 October 2016)

Foreign honours 

 Grand Cross of the Order of May, Merit Class, Argentina (18 June 2003)
 Grand-Cross of the Order of Charles III, Spain (25 November 2016)
 Grand-Cross of the Order of Honour, Greece (21 April 2017)

References

|-

|-

|-

Labor ministers
Portuguese agnostics
1949 births
Living people
Socialist Party (Portugal) politicians
Government ministers of Portugal
Technical University of Lisbon alumni
Presidents of the Assembly of the Republic (Portugal)